WMFQ (92.9 FM) is a commercial radio station in Ocala, Florida, broadcasting to the Greater Ocala area.  The station's format is Contemporary Hit Radio and Top 40.

History
The station began broadcasting in July 1977 with a beautiful music format; the calls stood for We Mean Fine Quality, as in the station's "quality" music.  The format evolved into adult contemporary by 1990, using the slogan "Q-Lite 92.9" and then "Q92.9." The oldies format was adopted in 2004.

As an oldies station "Big Oldies 92.9", despite the "Biggest Hits of the 60s and 70s" slogan, the station also played a fair amount of music from the 1980s, having added artists like Madonna, Cyndi Lauper, Naked Eyes, George Michael, Tiffany, and Culture Club to its playlist.

On August 1, 2011, WMFQ changed their format to hot adult contemporary, branded as "92Q".

On June 1, 2013, JVC Broadcasting purchased WMFQ from Asterisk Communications along with WTRS, WBXY, WXJZ and WYGC. WMFQ was then re-branded as "Q92". With the new ownership and management, longtime morning man Bill Barr was promoted to Program Director. In October 2013, WMFQ made a shift to mainstream Top 40/CHR focusing on the biggest hits and new music. WMFQ is now the only station with a city-grade signal in the Metro Ocala area playing 'hit music'. Q92.9 broadcasts to the entire Ocala/Gainesville radio market.

The station was previously heard on 104.9 WYGC, bringing it a decent signal to Gainesville as WMFQ's signal is unlistenable in some parts of the Gainesville area.

On January 25, 2021, WMFQ began airing Elvis Duran and the Morning Show after hosts Jenn Ryan and Kevin "Bus" Birdhouse were furloughed, and transferred to WYOY in Jackson, Mississippi.

References

External links
Official Website

MFQ
Contemporary hit radio stations in the United States
Radio stations established in 1977
1977 establishments in Florida